Yeni Yol (New Path) or Sosyalist Demokrasi için Yeniyol (New Path for Socialist Democracy) is the Turkish section of the reunified Fourth International. The formation of the movement goes back to the magazine called Permanent Revolution (Sürekli Devrim in Turkish), began publishing in 1978. It formed an internal tendency within the Freedom and Solidarity Party, which later dissolved. In 2022, the movement declared that they joined Workers' Party of Turkey.

See also
Labourist Movement Party
Revolutionary Socialist Workers' Party (Turkey)
Revolutionary Workers' Party (Turkey)
Socialist Alternative (Turkey)
Workers' Fraternity Party

References

External links
Official website

Fourth International (post-reunification)
Political parties with year of establishment missing
Trotskyist organizations in Turkey